Danny Pinheiro Rodrigues (born 16 April 1985) is a French male artistic gymnast and a member of the national team. He was selected to compete for the French gymnastics squad in two editions of the Summer Olympic Games (2008 in Beijing and 2016 in Rio de Janeiro). He missed 2012 Olympics due to injury.

At his second Olympic appearance in Rio de Janeiro, Pinheiro originally finished the rings apparatus in tenth position from the qualifying phase, but moved into the final after his teammate Samir Aït Saïd suffered a left leg injury and Dutch gymnast Yuri van Gelder was expelled from the competition for breaching team rules, including alcohol consumption.

References

External links 
 
 
 
 

1985 births
Living people
French male artistic gymnasts
French people of Portuguese descent
Sportspeople from Rouen
Gymnasts at the 2008 Summer Olympics
Gymnasts at the 2016 Summer Olympics
Olympic gymnasts of France
Mediterranean Games bronze medalists for France
Mediterranean Games gold medalists for France
Mediterranean Games silver medalists for France
Mediterranean Games medalists in gymnastics
Competitors at the 2009 Mediterranean Games
21st-century French people